The Cleft Lip and Palate Association, also known as CLAPA, is a national charity registered in England, Wales, and Scotland which supports people affected by cleft lip and cleft palate in the United Kingdom.

CLAPA was established in 1979 as a partnership between health professionals and parents of children with cleft lip and cleft palate. It provides support for new parents, for people with the condition and their families, from infancy through to adulthood.

The organisation's office is in London, but staff are based around the UK.

Aims
The main aims of CLAPA are:
 Bringing together people affected by cleft to promote mutual support in a variety of ways
 Promoting a positive image of cleft through stories, images and videos of people affected by the condition
 Providing one-to-one support and advocacy
 Providing information on cleft lip and palate
 Promoting research into cleft lip and palate
 Supplying specialist feeding equipment for babies born with a cleft
 Working with NHS Cleft Teams to improve cleft care in the UK

BAFTAs controversy
At BAFTA Television Awards at the London Palladium Theatre in London on 20 May 2007, when presenting Ricky Gervais with the award for best comedy performance Joan Rivers made a joke referring to the statuette as a "Jew with a harelip". CLAPA Chief Executive Gareth Davies wrote directly to BAFTA to express his "serious disappointment" at the incident and he said that "many people found the old-fashioned term "harelip" highly offensive and that "making the condition the subject of a cheap joke was simply hurtful"

Rivers said that she was extremely sorry for any offence caused as this had certainly not been her intention. Amanda Berry, BAFTA Chief Executive, stated that the academy would "never set out to offend nor make fun of anyone".

On their website CLAPA said it was pleased to receive the apologies but is aware that too many people are still ill-informed about what cleft lip and palate is and what it is not. They added that this ignorance can often feed into prejudice and the media and those in the public eye have a key role in helping us de-stigmatise the condition.

Patron
Carol Vorderman is the current patron of CLAPA. She got involved with the charity because her older brother, Anton, was born with a cleft lip and palate. He had treatment at Alder Hay Hospital in Merseyside and life was not always easy for him or his family. He is the first to acknowledge that it was his family that carried him through all the difficult times and he is now a successful businessman based in the Netherlands. He retains strong links with his home town, Prestatyn, in North Wales.

Board of trustees
The governing body of CLAPA is a board of trustees who are volunteers. The board is a mix of people affected by cleft lip and/or palate (with a cleft or parent of a child with a cleft) and health professionals involved in the care of people born with cleft lip and palate. Trustees are selected on the basis of what skills they can bring to the charity and vacancies are advertised in the national press.

Current trustees:

Nicolas Astor (Chair)
Jasvinder Bhachu (Treasurer) 
Jemma Morgan
Rona Slator
Andrew Beedham
David John Drake
Louise Hughes
Marie Pinkstone
Emma Howes
Oliver Hopkins
Jennifer Ruth Williams|

References

External links
 CLAPA website
 Adult Voices
 CLAPA Community
 Cleft Lip and Palate Association page on Charity Commission
 CLAPA page on Scottish Charity Register

Bethnal Green
Charities based in London
Dental organisations based in the United Kingdom
Health charities in the United Kingdom
Health in the London Borough of Tower Hamlets
Oral and maxillofacial surgery organizations
Organisations based in the London Borough of Tower Hamlets
Organizations established in 1979
Support groups
1979 establishments in the United Kingdom